

Administrative and municipal divisions

References

Kurgan Oblast
Kurgan Oblast